Frederick Ryecraft (29 August 1939 – 26 September 2017) was an English professional footballer who played in the Football League for Brentford as a goalkeeper. He was a member of the club's 1962–63 Fourth Division championship-winning team.

Club career

Brentford 
After a short spell at Athenian League club Southall, Ryecraft joined Third Division club Brentford in September 1959. First team goalkeeper Gerry Cakebread's durability meant that a spell doing national service saw Ryecraft confined to the club's reserve team, until the first team's relegation to the Fourth Division in 1962. Ryecraft finally made his first team debut in a 2–1 defeat to Gillingham on 21 August 1962. He went on to make 18 appearances during a 1962–63 season which saw the Bees return to the Third Division at the first time of asking. Ryecraft made 20 appearances during the 1963–64 season, but mainly appeared for the reserves and was released at the end of the campaign. Ryecraft made a total of 38 first team appearances for the Bees and along with Micky Ball and Johnny Hales, he is one of three players to make over 150 appearances for the Brentford reserve team.

Gravesend & Northfleet 
After his release from Brentford, Ryecraft dropped back into non-league football and played for Southern League First Division club Gravesend & Northfleet.

Representative career 
While undertaking his national service, Ryecraft played for the British Army representative team and the Combined Services. He played on a tour of South East Asia in 1962 and was a member of the victorious Kentish Cup-winning team the same year.

Personal life 
While on national service in the British Army, Ryecraft was a member of the Royal Army Service Corps.

Honours 
British Army
 Kentish Cup: 1962
Brentford
Football League Fourth Division: 1962–63

Career statistics

References

1939 births
People from Southall
English footballers
Brentford F.C. players
English Football League players
Southall F.C. players
Ebbsfleet United F.C. players
Southern Football League players
Association football goalkeepers
Royal Army Service Corps soldiers
2017 deaths
20th-century British Army personnel